Danilo Soddimo (born 27 September 1987) is an Italian footballer.

Background
He has gradually made his way through the Sampdoria's youth system, and made his Serie A debut on April 30, 2006 in a home match against Udinese. He was loaned out to Sambenedettese during the 2007 summer transfer window in order to let him achieve some first team experience.

In July 2009, he was loaned to Salernitana. but in January 2010 the loan was canceled. He then joined Pescara in co-ownership deal for €300,000. (swapped with 50% rights of Loris Bacchetti also for €300,000) In June 2010 Pescara acquired the full rights of Soddimo also for €300,000, with Emanuele Testardi joined Sampdoria for €450,000.

He extended his contract to June 2014 in December 2010. In January 2013 Soddimo was signed by Serie B club U.S. Grosseto F.C. in temporary deal.

In July 2013 he was signed by Frosinone.

On 8 January 2019, he signed a multi-year contract with Serie B club Cremonese.

On 16 January 2020, he signed with Serie B club Pisa for a term of 1.5-years with an option for an additional season.

References

External links

1987 births
Living people
Italian footballers
Footballers from Rome
Association football midfielders
Serie A players
Serie B players
Serie C players
U.C. Sampdoria players
A.S. Sambenedettese players
A.C. Ancona players
U.S. Salernitana 1919 players
Delfino Pescara 1936 players
F.C. Grosseto S.S.D. players
Frosinone Calcio players
U.S. Cremonese players
Pisa S.C. players
Italy youth international footballers
Italy under-21 international footballers